The 2016–17 season was Fleetwood Town's 109th season in their history and third consecutive season in League One. Along with League One, the club also participated in the FA Cup, League Cup and League Trophy.

The season covered the period from 1 July 2016 to 30 June 2017, with competitive matches played between August and May.

Transfers

In

Out

Loans in

Loans out

Competitions

Pre-season friendlies

League One

League table

Matches

Play-offs

FA Cup

EFL Cup

EFL Trophy

References

Fleetwood Town F.C. seasons
Fleetwood Town